Oliver James (Olly) Allen (born 27 May 1982 in Norwich, Norfolk) is a former motorcycle speedway rider and now team manager from England.

Family
His brother Tommy rode for the Somerset Rebels.

Career
In 2013 he won the Premier League Riders' Championship.

In September 2019 he was appointed as joint team manager (with Simon Stead) of the Great Britain speedway team.

References 

British speedway riders
English motorcycle racers
1982 births
Living people
Swindon Robins riders
Coventry Bees riders
Eastbourne Eagles riders
King's Lynn Stars riders
Lakeside Hammers riders
Peterborough Panthers riders
Ipswich Witches riders
Individual Speedway Long Track World Championship riders